The High Court of Bhutan derives its authority from the 2008 Constitution of Bhutan. It consists of the Chief Justice and eight Drangpons (Associate Justices). The Chief Justice and Drangpons of the High Court are appointed from among juniors, peers, and eminent jurists by the Druk Gyalpo. The judges of the High Court serve 10 year terms, or until reaching age 60; this retirement age is unique among the Civil Service and Constitutional Offices of Bhutan — all others retire at age 65. During their tenure, they are subject to censure and suspension by the Druk Gyalpo on the recommendation of the National Judicial Commission for proven misbehavior that does not rise to the level of impeachment.

List of High Court Judges
 Acting Chief Justice of the High Court of Bhutan - Dasho Sangay Khandu(Justice, Supreme court of Bhutan)
 Justice, Dasho Lungten Drubgyur (retd)
 Justice, Dasho Tshering Namgyal (retd) 
 Justice, Dasho Duba Dukpa (Chief Justice of the High Court)
 Justice, Dasho Kinley Dorji 
 Justice, Dasho Pema Wangchuk
 Justice, Dasho Pema Rinzin
 Justice, Dasho Dr. Jangchub Norbu
 Justice, Dasho Pasang Wangmo
 Justice, Dasho Birkha Bdr. Tamang
 Justice, Dasho Tshering Dorji
 Justice, Dasho Lobzang Rinzin

See also
Supreme Court of Bhutan
Dzongkhag Court
Dungkhag Court
Constitution of Bhutan
Politics of Bhutan
Judicial system of Bhutan
Judiciary

Notes

References

External links

Judiciary of Bhutan
Courts in Bhutan
1967 establishments in Bhutan
Courts and tribunals established in 1967